The Open Championship is an annual golf competition established in 1860, and is organised by The R&A. It is played on the weekend of the third Friday in July, and is the last of the four major championships to be played each year. The championship is currently held on a different course each year. Of the 14 that have been used, 10 are currently used in the rota. All the courses on the rota are links courses.

Prestwick Golf Club hosted the first championship in 1860 and remained the sole venue until 1873, when the Old Course at St Andrews hosted the event. Prestwick hosted a further 12 championships, the last in 1925. Musselburgh Links became the third course to host the championship in 1874. The three courses rotated the hosting of the championship until 1892 when Muirfield hosted the event. The Honourable Company of Edinburgh golfers built their own course at Muirfield and Musselburgh was removed from the rota as a result. Royal St George's Golf Club became the first course outside Scotland to host the championship in 1894.

Royal Liverpool Golf Club hosted the event for the first time in 1897. Royal Cinque Ports Golf Club became the next course to host the event in 1909. The course hosted a further championship in 1920, but further attempts to host the Championship in 1938 and 1949 were thwarted by bad weather and the course was dropped from the rota. Royal Troon, Royal Lytham & St Annes and Carnoustie held the Open Championship for the first time in 1923, 1926 and 1931 respectively. The following year Prince's Golf Club hosted the event for the only time. The course was requisitioned by the military during the Second World War and was extensively damaged. Royal Birkdale was chosen as the host course in 1940, however, due to the Second World War the event did not go ahead. It was not until 1954 that Royal Birkdale hosted the Open.

The Old Course at St Andrews has hosted the most championships with 30 in total, most recently with the 2022 Open Championship. The championship has been held outside Scotland and England twice, in 1951 and 2019; Royal Portrush Golf Club in Northern Ireland was the venue for both tournaments. Turnberry became the most recent course to have hosted the Championship for the first time, when it held the 1977 Open Championship. However, Martin Slumbers, the Chief Executive of The R&A said in 2021, "We had no plans to stage any of our championships at Turnberry and will not do so in the foreseeable future. We will not return until we are convinced that the focus will be on the championship, the players and the course itself and we do not believe that is achievable in the current circumstances." 

With Scotland, England and Northern Ireland hosting The Open, Wales is now the only country yet to join The Open rota within the United Kingdom. Golfweek said in 2019 that "The R&A should go out of its way to put Royal Porthcawl in its pool of Open Championship courses."

Venues

Notes
A.  From 1860 to 1891 The Open Championship was contested over 36 holes.

Footnotes

References

External links
 Official website of The Open Championship

 
Open